Sein Ye Forest Park is a forest park of Burma. It is located in Oaktwin Township in Bago Division.

References

Protected areas of Myanmar
Protected areas established in 1996